William Perkins (1558–1602) was an influential English cleric and Cambridge theologian, receiving both a B.A. and M.A. from the university in 1581 and 1584 respectively, and also one of the foremost leaders of the Puritan movement in the Church of England during the Elizabethan era. Although not entirely accepting of the Church of England's ecclesiastical practices, Perkins conformed to many of the policies and procedures imposed by the Elizabethan Settlement. He did remain, however, sympathetic to the non-conformist puritans and even faced disciplinary action for his support.

Perkins was a prolific author who penned over forty works, many of which were published posthumously. In addition to writing, he also served as a fellow at Christ's College and as a lecturer at St Andrew's Church in Cambridge. He was a firm proponent of Reformed theology, particularly the supralapsarian theology of Theodore Beza and John Calvin. In addition, he was a staunch defender of Protestant ideals, specifically the five solae with a particular emphasis on solus Christus and sola Scriptura.

Early life 

Perkins was born to Thomas and Anna Perkins at Marston Jabbett in the parish of Bulkington, Warwickshire, England in 1558, the year in which the Protestant Elizabeth I succeeded her Catholic sister Mary as Queen of England.  Perkins lived his entire life under Elizabeth I, dying one year before the Queen's own death in 1603.  Perkins's relationship with Elizabeth was ambiguous: on the one hand, she was Good Queen Bess, the monarch under whom England finally and firmly became a Protestant nation; on the other hand, Perkins and the other members of the Puritan movement were frustrated that the Elizabethan settlement had not gone far enough and pushed for further Reformation.

Little is known of Perkins' childhood and upbringing. Sometime in his early life he was rendered lame which forced him to write with his left hand. His family was evidently of some means, since in June 1577, at age 19, Perkins was enrolled as a pensioner of Christ's College, Cambridge being trained in the tradition of the Reformed scholastic framework. He would receive his BA in 1581 and his MA in 1584.

According to an unverifiable story, Perkins was convicted of the error of his ways after he heard a Cambridge mother say to her child, "Hold your tongue, or I will give you to drunken Perkins yonder." Whether or not the story is true, it is clear that Perkins had a religious awakening sometime between 1581 and 1584 during his time at Cambridge. Thomas Fuller's biographical profile of Perkins portrayed him as "very wild in his youth," skilled in mathematics, possessed of "a rare felicity in speedy reading of books," and preaching, early in his ministry, with a sternness that he mitigated in later years:He would pronounce the word damn with such an emphasis, as left a doleful echo in his auditors' ears a good while after.... But in his older age he altered his voice and remitted much of his former rigidness; often professing that to preach mercy was that proper office of the ministers of the Gospel.Perkins's sermons, wrote Fuller, "were not so plain but that the piously learned did admire them, nor so learned but that the plain did understand them."

Perkins thus began a lifelong association with the "moderate-puritan" wing of the Church of England which held views similar to those of the continental Calvinist theologians Theodore Beza, Girolamo Zanchi, and Zacharias Ursinus.  Perkins's circle at Cambridge included Laurence Chaderton and Richard Greenham.

Perkins as clergyman and Cambridge fellow 

Following his ordination, Perkins also preached his first sermons to the prisoners of the Cambridge jail. On one celebrated occasion, Perkins encountered a young man who was going to be executed for his crimes and who feared he was shortly going to be in hell: Perkins convinced the man that, through Christ, God could forgive his sins, and the formerly distraught youth faced his execution with manly composure as a result.

In 1584, after receiving his MA, Perkins was elected as a fellow of Christ's College, a post he held until 1594.  In 1585, he became a Lecturer of St Andrew the Great in Cambridge, a post he held until his death.

Perkins's churchmanship 

As a "moderate Puritan", Perkins was firmly opposed to non-conformists and other separatists who refused to conform to the Church of England. On the other hand, he also opposed the Elizabethan regime's program of imposing uniformity on the church.  For example, when Archbishop of Canterbury John Whitgift imprisoned Francis Johnson for Johnson's support of a presbyterian form of church polity, Perkins loudly defended Johnson. This was not an isolated incident, and he appeared before the commission more than once.

On 13 January 1587, Perkins preached a sermon denouncing the practice of kneeling to receive Communion, and was ultimately called before the Vice-Chancellor as a result. During the final set of trials against Puritan ministers in 1590–91, Perkins confirmed that he had discussed the Book of Discipline with Puritan ministers, but claimed that he could not remember whom he had talked to. Perkins married Timothye Cradocke of Grantchester on 2 July 1595. (He had previously resigned his fellowship at Christ's College, since only unmarried men could be fellows.) They became the parents of seven children, three of whom died in youth from various causes, and one of whom was born after Perkins himself had died.

Theological opinions 

Perkins was a proponent of "double predestination" and was a major player in introducing the thought of Theodore Beza to England. He viewed the Reformed concept of the Covenant of Grace, which is central to Reformed soteriology and double predestination, to be a doctrine of great consoling value. He was responsible for the publication in English of Beza's famous chart about double predestination. Writing less than a century after Perkins's death, his biographer Thomas Fuller recounted an objection that Perkins's views on double predestination often prompted:Some object that his doctrine, referring all to an absolute decree, hamstrings all industry, and cuts off the sinews of men's endeavours towards salvation. For, ascribing all to the wind of God's Spirit, (which bloweth where it listeth,) he leaveth nothing to the oars of man's diligence, either to help or hinder to the attaining of happiness, but rather opens a wide door to licentious security.
In addition to adopting a Reformed soteriology, Perkins also strongly held to the doctrines of solo Christo and sola Scriptura which "serve as the twin foundation stones for what Perkins conceived as biblical preaching." He was also a major proponent of literal interpretation utilizing the regula fidei, or Rule of Faith. This principle advocates that the unclear portions of scripture ought to be interpreted by the clear portions rather than by tradition or speculation. He did, however, leave room for figurative or analogical language when context demands.

Influence 
Although relatively unknown to modern Christians, Perkins has had an influence that is felt by Christians all around the world. and was highly regarded in the Elizabethan Church. In addition,  Perkins's views on double predestination made him a major target of Jacobus Arminius, the Dutch Reformed clergyman who opposed the doctrine of predestination. He also was influential in the theological development of the American puritan philosopher and theologian Jonathan Edwards. In addition, some consider the hermeneutics of Perkins to be a model that ought to be emulated.

In his lifetime, Perkins attained enormous popularity, with sales of his works eventually surpassing even Calvin's. When he died, his writings were selling more copies than those of many of the most famous of the Reformers combined.

From his position at Cambridge, Perkins was able to influence a whole generation of English churchmen. His pupils include:

 William Ames, Puritan theologian whose "Marrow of Theology" was the most popular systematic theology of the time became professor of theology at Franeker, Netherlands
 John Robinson, the founder of congregationalism in Leiden and pastor of the group which went on to found the Plymouth Colony
 Thomas Goodwin, Congregationalist minister and Puritan theologian who was a vital part of the Westminster Assembly
 Paul Baynes, Puritan preacher and successor to Perkins as lecturer at the church of St Andrew the Great in Cambridge
 Samuel Ward, Puritan preacher and master of Sidney Sussex College, Cambridge
 Phineas Fletcher, a poet
 Thomas Draxe, English puritan and theologian
 Thomas Taylor, Puritan preacher and Doctor of Divinity at Cambridge
 James Ussher, Archbishop of Armagh
 James Montagu, master of Sidney Sussex and later bishop of Winchester
 Richard Sibbes, Puritan preacher of Gray's Inn and Master at Catherine's Hall known for his eloquence and comforting sermons
 John Cotton, Colonial American Puritan minister and theologian of the Massachusetts Bay Colony
 Thomas Hooker, Colonial American Puritan minister and founder of the Connecticut Colony
 Thomas Shepard, Colonial American Puritan minister and theologian known for his leadership in the Antinomian Controversy

Death 

In 1602, Perkins suffered from "the stone".  After several weeks of suffering, he died on 22 October 1602 at age 44.

James Montagu preached his funeral sermon, taking as his text Joshua 1.2, ‘Moses my servant is dead’.  He was buried in St. Andrew's, the church which he had pastored for eighteen years.

Publications by Perkins 
 
  (1584)
  Who Shall Win the  Whetstone: Also, A Resolution to the Count  (1585)
The points that are handled are set  in the page following  (1590)
   (1590)
A view of the order , is to be  in the table annexed  (1591)
 The foundation of Christian religion : gathered into  principles. And it is to bee learned of ignorant people, that they may be fit to hear sermons with profit, and to  the Lords Supper with comfort  (1591)
   (1592)
 A case of conscience : the greatest that  was; how a man may know whether he be the child of God or no.  by the word of God. Zanchius  (1592)
 An exposition of the Lords prayer : in the way of catechising  for ignorant people  (1592)
  treatises·: I. Of the nature and practise of repentance. II. Of the combat of the flesh and spirit  (1593)
 A direction for the government of the tongue according to Gods word  (1593)
And it may  for  instruction to 1. Women when they  of child  (1595)
 A declaration of the true manner of knowing Christ crucified  (1596)
   (1598)
   (1598)
 The true  : more in worth then all the goods in the world  (1601)

Posthumously:

With distinct chapters, and contents of  book, and a  table of the whole  (1603)
 Lectures  the three first chapters of the : preached in Cambridge anno Dom. 1595  (1604)
   (1604)
 Satans  by our  Christ: and in  sermons further manifested  (1604)
 : or, a treatise of Christian  and moderation  (1604)
 M. Perkins, his Exhortation to repentance, out of Zephaniah: preached in 2. sermons in Sturbridge Faire. With a preface  touching the publishing of all such  of his as are to be expected: with a catalogue of all the  [sic] of them, diligently perused and published, by a preacher of the word  (1605)
 Works newly corrected according to his  copies  (1605)
 Of the calling of the  two treatises, describing the duties and dignities of that calling  (1605)
 The combat  Christ and the  displayed, or A  upon the temptations of Christ  (1606)
 A  and learned exposition  the whole epistle of ...  (1606)
 A treatise of mans imaginations : Shewing his  thoughts: His want of good thoughts: The way to  them  (1607)
 A discourse of the damned art of witchcraft: so  forth as it is revealed in the Scriptures and manifest by true experience ...  (1608)
 The  treatise of the cases of conscience : distinguished into three   (1608)
 Christian : or, A short survey of the right manner of erecting and ordering a  : according to the scriptures  (1609)
 A resolution to the countryman  it utterly  to buy or use our  prognostications  (1618)
The ninth edition. (1628)

Recent reprints:

 The Work of William Perkins, ed. Ian Breward  (1970)
 The Works of William Perkins,'' ed. Joel R. Beeke and Derek W. H. Thomas, 10 vols. (Grand Rapids, MI: Reformation Heritage Books, 2014–-2020).

References

Sources

External links
 

16th-century English Puritan ministers
English Calvinist and Reformed theologians
Supralapsarians
English evangelicals
1558 births
1602 deaths
Demonologists
Alumni of Christ's College, Cambridge
Fellows of Christ's College, Cambridge
16th-century English theologians
16th-century Calvinist and Reformed theologians
17th-century Calvinist and Reformed theologians
People from Nuneaton and Bedworth (district)
People from Warwickshire
16th-century English writers
16th-century male writers
17th-century English writers
17th-century English male writers
Witchcraft in England
17th-century Anglican theologians
16th-century Anglican theologians